The 2016–17 BIC Basket (39th edition), Angola's top tier basketball club competition, ran from November 15, 2016 through May 25, 2017. It consists of four stages plus the playoffs. At the initial stage (regular season) all nine teams played each other in a double round robin system. In stage 2 (group stage), the top five teams from the regular season played in a single round robin in each group. In stage 3 (qualification stage), the top five teams from group stage 1 played in a round robin in group A whereas the four teams in group B plus the relegated team from group A played round robin classification matches in group B. In stage 4 (playoffs), a best-of-five series will be played between first-seeded vs eighth-seeded, 4th vs 5th, 2nd vs 7th and 3rd vs 6th. The winners of the first and second match-up and of the third and fourth will play a best-of-five semifinal playoff whereas the losers will play a best-of-three 5th-8th classification round. The final will be played in a best-of-seven series.

BIC Basket Participants (2016–17 Season)

Regular Season (November 15, 2016 - 18 February 2017)

 Note: Small number and number in brackets indicate round number and leg, respectively Next scheduled games

Regular season standings
Updated as of 19 February 2017

 1 loss by default (no point awarded)

Stage 2 (March 3 - April 15, 2017)
Times given below are in WAT UTC+1.

Group A

 Advance to quarter-finals

Group B

 Advance to quarter-finals

5–8th classification

5–8th classification

Quarter-finals

Libolo bt Lusíada

Petro bt Progresso

Interclube bt Marinha

1º de Agosto bt ASA

Semifinals

Libolo bt Interclube

Petro bt D'Agosto

Fifth place match

Third place match

Final

See also
BIC Basket
2016 2nd Division Basketball
BAI Basket Past Seasons
Federação Angolana de Basquetebol

External links
Angolan Basketball Federation at Fiba Live Stats
Schedules & results
List of players
Official Website 
Africabasket.com League Page at Africabasket

References

Angolan Basketball League seasons
League
Angola